The 1982 Prince Edward Island general election was held on September 27, 1982.

In 1981, after just two years as premier, Angus MacLean resigned his position after the election of James Lee to the Progressive Conservative leadership. In the same year, the Liberals selected future premier Joe Ghiz as their leader. Lee called an early election (traditionally elections in PEI are held every four years) in which a few seats changed hands, but the overall count stayed the same as in 1979.

This election also marked the lowest point in popular support for the New Democrats on PEI, who were led by an interim leader.

Party standings

Members elected

The Legislature of Prince Edward Island had two levels of membership from 1893 to 1996 - Assemblymen and Councillors. This was a holdover from when the Island had a bicameral legislature, the General Assembly and the Legislative Council.

In 1893, the Legislative Council was abolished and had its membership merged with the Assembly, though the two titles remained separate and were elected by different electoral franchises. Assembleymen were elected by all eligible voters of within a district. Before 1963, Councillors were only elected by landowners within a district, but afterward they were elected in the same manner as Assemblymen.

Kings

Prince

Queens

Sources

Further reading
 

1982 elections in Canada
Elections in Prince Edward Island
1982 in Prince Edward Island
September 1982 events in Canada